The Daimler Regency series was a luxury car made in Coventry by The Daimler Company Limited between 1951 and 1958. Only an estimated 49 examples of the 3-litre Regency chassis were made because demand for new cars collapsed just weeks after its introduction. Almost three years later in October 1954, a lengthened more powerful Regency Mark II (DF304) was announced but, in turn, after a production run of 345 cars, it was replaced by the very much faster, up-rated One-O-Four (DF310), announced in October 1955.

Regency DF300/1
Displayed to the press on 26 September and the following week at the Paris Motor Show, it was first shown to the British public at the October 1951 Motor Show. The DF300 model designation was used for right-hand drive and DF301 for left-hand drive. The chassis included a number of new developments from the Daimler Consort which was still in production. The engine was moved well forward, the ground clearance increased by one inch and the chassis side members lowered. It was fitted with a new 3-litre 6 cylinder engine derived from the 4 cylinder 2-litre engine in the production Lanchester Fourteen. Twin SU carburettors were fitted to give 90 bhp at 4,100 rpm.

The shape of the standard Barker saloon body closely resembled the much smaller Lanchester Fourteen, except that the headlights were fitted into the mudguards in the same position as the Daimler Consort. It was joined in 1952 by an Empress II saloon, limousine and convertible, all with razor-edge styling by Hooper.

Only a small number of Regency Barker Special Sports were made, perhaps three. They were externally distinguished by having front-hinged doors, not the "suicide doors" of the smaller-engined version. The usual Daimler Fluid Flywheel coupled the engine and its Wilson pre-selector 4-speed gearbox.

All new car sales collapsed in 1952 while the nation waited for the removal of a "temporarily" increased  purchase tax, finally eased in April 1953. Including Empress models, an estimated 49 3-litre cars were produced before production stopped.

DF300/1 chassis numbers

 
Of the DF300/1 chassis produced (excluding DF302/3), it is believed that only three have survived into the 21st century.

As per company policy at the time, pre-production chassis were either dismantled or retained as factory runarounds.

DF302/3 – Empress Mk IIs and Coupes
A Hooper Empress Mark II was first exhibited at Earls Court in 1952 (chassis 82002). Hooper produced 33 examples, plus one on a standard 3-litre chassis (80002).  Power was boosted to 100 bhp at 4,400 rpm by using an aluminium cylinder head and a higher 7.5 to 1 compression ratio.

Note that Lady Docker's October 1953 Earls Court Motor Show car Silver Flash was listed in Hooper records as a 3-litre chassis, but with chassis number 85001. This was a Lanchester Fourteen chassis modified to fit a Daimler 6-cylinder engine.

Chassis numbers

It is thought that about half of all 3-litre Empress Mk II models survive. Both 2-door examples survived into the 21st century.

Regency Mark II DF304/5
The revised Regency DF304 labelled Mark II was announced in October 1954. Left-hand-drive cars used the DF305 designation. The new more flowing body was slightly longer with a much longer boot and mudguards and was lower-set. It could now be purchased with a 3½-litre or 4½-litre engine. Again there was a Hooper version, the Empress IIa and III but now also the Sportsman four-light saloon with coachwork by Mulliners (Birmingham). The (at first only) 4½-litre Sportsman with three-piece wrap-around rear window and extra interior luxury features was announced a few days later 
Introductory pricing including tax: 3½-litre / 4½-litre engine
Regency Mark II saloon: £2,324 / £2,778 with the new Tubeless Tyres fitted as standard equipment
Regency Sportsman saloon: £2,650 / £3,104

The revised chassis was again made of box section steel and was cruciform braced. The side members rose over the rear axle and were not underslung like the Consort. The suspension was independent at the front using coil springs but retained traditional leaf springs and live axle at the rear. Automatic chassis lubrication continued to be fitted, operating "thermostatically every time the engine warm(ed) up", and the propeller-shaft centre bearing was "prepacked with grease" so did not require lubrication.    However, the propeller shaft itself was not served by the system and four grease points required "attention every 1,000 miles". Marles worm and double roller steering was used. Brakes were Girling hydro-mechanical – hydraulic at front, mechanical to the rear – as was standard Daimler practice at that time on the Consort, Conquest and Lanchester Fourteen.

4½-litre chassis
These examples had a chassis designation of DF400 (DF401 for LHD).  The 4½-litre engine was offered as an option on the Regency Mark II chassis, but very few were fitted. The car differed from the 3½-litre DF304 in that a 4-speed pre-selector gearbox was fitted with direct drive in 3rd gear and an overdrive 4th gear. In addition, the DF304's Girling hydro-mechanical brakes were replaced with a fully hydraulic system with vacuum assist.
After an engine upgrade from 127 to 167 bhp in 1956, the increased torque proved to be too much for the pre-selector gearboxes, so very few 4½-litre cars survived. Plans for deliveries of further 4½-litre chassis were cancelled and most existing cars were recalled and converted to 3½-litre engines. Ultimately, the 4½-litre engine was restricted to the DK400 chassis.

Performance
The test car cost £2324 including taxes.

Commercial
A spacious interior married with "an abundance of polished hardwood, not only for the facia but also for the door cappings, a floor .... covered with thick pile carpet" and the car's driving qualities will have attracted admiration, but purchase tax on cars was high and in 1954 the UK manufacturer-recommended retail price, including tax, for the standard bodied 3½-litre Daimler Regency was £2,324.  That price included a heater, but customers requiring a radio to be fitted would need to find another £48.  In the same year Jaguar's recommended UK retail price for the similarly sized (and very effectively promoted) Mark VII was £1,680.  (Jaguar buyers also received the heater included in the price, though they were obliged to find an extra £50 for a radio.)  The price differential is probably enough to explain why relatively few Daimler Regency models found buyers but it should be pointed out that the Daimler was a much more substantial and durable product assembled with much greater care than Jaguars of that same day and aimed at quite different customers.

Chassis numbers
The total chassis allocation was 395 units, but as noted not all may have been built. Standard production is thought to be 345 cars, allowing for chassis reallocation when some were fitted with the higher performance engine in late Regency Mark II production.  58 chassis were allocated for specialist coachwork, e.g. Hooper Empress Mark IIa and III. These incorporated a number of minor improvements over the DF304 chassis.

Replacing the Mark II
The Regency Mark II proved more successful than the first Regency, but after a short production run of only one year it was superseded in October 1955 by the 3½-litre One-O-Four (DF310) with a more powerful engine and various other upgrades. While the top speed of the One-O-Four was tested at 102 mph compared to the Regency's 85 mph, the Regency actually had faster acceleration up to 50 mph. Standing quarter mile times for the One-O-Four were unchanged from the Regency. However when the automatic gearbox became available for the One-O-Four, the standing quarter mile was actually 2 full seconds slower than the Regency.

Daimler One-O-Four
Announced in October 1955 the 3½-litre engine was given a new cylinder head and compression ratio of 7.6:1 generating almost 30% more power ( @ 4,400 rpm) to push the same 2-tonne Mk II to 104 m.p.h. With upgraded brakes and interior, branded with a fluted boss bearing a large D in the centre of its back bumper, it was advertised as the 100 m.p.h. Daimler One-O-Four, when there were no open-road speed limits. The One-O-Four name refers to a prototype reaching the speed of 104 m.p.h. during testing. During 1956 a Borg-Warner fully automatic gearbox became available. A One-O-Four Lady's Model was produced, finding only 49 customers. The special accessories in the Lady's Model inspired by Lady Docker became optional extras the following year. The One-O-Four was eventually replaced by the Daimler Majestic. When it first arrived in July 1958, the Majestic replaced the automatic One-O-Four. If customers wanted the pre-selector gearbox, they could still choose a One-O-Four. No more than 559 One-O-Fours of all models were produced before production ended in 1958. The car did not appear at the 1958 Earl's Court motor show.

Chassis numbers

One-O-Four Upgrades
Numerous upgrades to the Regency Mark II were incorporated into the Daimler One-O-Four.  The following is a summary of the major changes.  In addition, many minor changes were introduced.

References
Citations

Sources

External links
 Special Sports fixed head coupé by Barker DF302
 Regency DF304 Mark II
 Empress II saloon by Hooper
 Sportsman saloon by Barker, 4½-litre
 Silver Flash for Lady Docker

Regency
Cars introduced in 1951
Luxury vehicles